The Armenian Border Guard is the branch of the National Security Service of Armenia that is responsible for monitoring and guarding Armenia's borders with neighbors Turkey, Azerbaijan, Iran and Georgia. The border guard works in conjunction with a Russian military contingent from the Federal Security Service stationed in Armenia and headquartered at the 102nd Military Base in Gyumri.

History
The border guard was initially subordinated to the Ministry of Defence when it was established on 28 January 1992 with the rest of the military. On 26 April 1994, the draft Law "On the State Border" was introduced by the National Assembly of Armenia. Its charter was signed into law on 20 November 2001. In 2004 it was transferred to the jurisdiction of the Ministry of National Security and Internal Affairs. The first general meeting of the Union of Veterans and Pensioners of the Border Guard Troops took place in late 2019.

Mechanized equipment
As of 2022, the Ministry of National Security and Internal Affairs has its disposal 5 BMD-1s, 35 BMP-1s, 3 BRM-1Ks, 5 BTR-60s, and 18 BTR-70s.

Leadership

Commanders
 General Yuri Khatchaturov (1992-2000)
 Major General Armen Abrahamyan (November 2005-12 June 2018)
 Colonel General Vaghinak Sargsyan (12 June 2018 – 26 October 2020)
 Colonel Arman Maralchyan (since 26 October 2020)

Chief of Staff of the Border Guard
 Gagik Tevosyan (?-26 October 2020)
 Colonel Arman Gasparyan (since 26 October 2020)

See also
 Armed Forces of Armenia
 Armenian Air Force

Notes

Border guards
Border Guard
1994 establishments in Armenia